Ekaterina Terekhova (born 1987) is a Russian orienteering competitor and junior world champion.

She won a gold medal in the relay at the 2006 Junior World Orienteering Championships in Druskininkai, together with Tatiana Kozlova and Maria Shilova. She finished 5th in the sprint at the same championship.

References

External links
 

1987 births
Living people
Russian orienteers
Female orienteers
Foot orienteers
Junior World Orienteering Championships medalists